The Division of Kalgoorlie was an Australian electoral division in the state of Western Australia, named after the city of Kalgoorlie. The Division was proclaimed in 1900 as one of the original 65 divisions to be contested at the first federal election in 1901. In its final form, it covered most of the land area of Western Australia, with a size of —over 90 percent of the state's landmass (an area the size of France, Spain, Germany, Italy, Poland and Great Britain combined). It included the Goldfields-Esperance, Gascoyne, Pilbara and Kimberley regions of Western Australia, in addition to the eastern and far northern parts of the Mid West region, and the town of Merredin. It was the largest single-member electorate by area in the world—almost a third of the continent.

History
For most of its history, Kalgoorlie was split between strongly pro-Labor territory in the mining regions and more conservative-leaning farming areas, and from 1980s Labor also benefited from the support of indigenous voters in the northern parts of the electorate.   Unlike seats in the eastern states with similar demographics, it was not usually reckoned as a bellwether for winning government—primarily because most elections have already been decided by the time the first returns come in from the state. The Liberals (and their predecessors) and Labor alternated for long spells in the seat. As evidence of how little it was affected by trends in the rest of the country, all but one of its members from 1922 onward spent at least one term in opposition.

For most of the time from 1922 to 1995, the conservative farming areas were usually swamped by Labor support in mining towns. Labor lost the electorate only when its support in Western Australia collapsed, such as in the late 1970s due to the regional backlash against the Whitlam government. In 1995, however, sitting Labor MP Graeme Campbell was expelled from the party. He retained the electorate at the 1996 election but in 1998 was defeated by Liberal Barry Haase, who held the seat until its abolition despite vigorous challenges from Labor. Haase benefited from the popularity of the Liberal Party in Western Australia during this period, as well as a sharp decline in Labor support in the city of Kalgoorlie, previously a Labor stronghold for the better part of a century. When Haase was reelected in 2007, it was the only time that Labor had won government at an election without winning Kalgoorlie.

The division was abolished at the 2008 redistribution, effective from the 2010 federal election. Due to a drop in population, Kalgoorlie needed to increase in size. However, all of the proposed maps would have made it all but impossible to draw O'Connor, the other large country seat in Western Australia, in a way that it would have any rational basis.  Ultimately, the Australian Electoral Commission decided to abolish Kalgoorlie. Most of the northern portion of its territory was transferred to the new Division of Durack, while the southern portion (including the city of Kalgoorlie) was absorbed into O'Connor. Haase transferred to Durack. Upon the abolition of Kalgoorlie, the title of largest single member electoral constituency in the world passed to Nunavut in Canada.

None of its members got to retire at the time  of their choosing as they lost the seat in an election, lost party preselection, died in office, expelled (Hugh Mahon) and when the seat was abolished it necessitated its last member Barry Haase to move to the seat of Durack.

Members

Election results

References

External links
  map

1901 establishments in Australia
2010 disestablishments in Australia
Constituencies established in 1901
Constituencies disestablished in 2010
Former electoral divisions of Australia
Federal politics in Western Australia
Goldfields-Esperance